Last Act in Palmyra is a 1994 historical mystery crime novel by Lindsey Davis and the sixth book of the Marcus Didius Falco Mysteries series. Set in Rome, Nabatea, and Palmyra, the novel stars Marcus Didius Falco, informer and imperial agent. The title refers to the hunt undertaken by Falco for a murderer, the last act of which takes place in Palmyra, as well as plays upon Falco's temporary employment as a playwright with a travelling theatre group.

Plot summary
In Last Act in Palmyra, Falco takes on a new spying mission for Vespasian to the east of the Empire. He also plans to investigate the disappearance of a young musician, Sophrona. Falco and Helena Justina travel to Petra, where they encounter a theatre group who have just lost their playwright due to drowning. Joining them, Falco attempts to fulfill his various investigations, whilst at the same time write his new play, The Spook Who Spoke.

Characters in "Last Act in Palmyra"

Main Characters
 Anacrites — Imperial spy
 Helena Justina — Daughter of the Senator Decimus Camillus Verus
 Marcus Didius Falco — Informer and Imperial Agent from the Aventine.
 Musa — Priest from Dushara
 Sophrona — Musician, player of the water organ
 Thalia — Snake dancer

The Theatre Company
 Byrria — Actress
 Chremes — Actor-manager
 Congrio — Billposter
 Davos — Actor
 Grumio — Clown
 Philocrates — Actor
 Phrygia — Actress, wife of Chremes
 Tranio — Clown

The Orchestra
 Afrania — Tibia-player
 Ione — Tambourinist
 Plancina — Panpipe girl
 Ribes — Lyre-player

Major themes

 Several investigations, including a spying mission for the emperor, a disappearing musician, and the murder of a traveling playwright.
 Developing relationship of Marcus Didius Falco and Helena Justina.
The history and culture of the Roman Middle East (namely Arabia Petraea and Roman Syria).

Allusions/references to other works
 Members of the company make many references to New Comedy.
 As noted in the footnotes (p. 401 UK paperback edition), Falco's play, The Spook Who Spoke, bears more than a little resemblance to Hamlet by William Shakespeare.
 During the course of their journey, the travelling theatre company perform or refer to various plays, poems and playwrights. These include:
 Medea, The Trojan Women and The Bacchae by Euripides
 The Birds by Aristophanes
 Oedipus Rex by Sophocles
 The Girl from Andros and The Mother-in-Law by Terence
 The Rope, The Pot of Gold and Amphitryon by Plautus
 The Arbitration by Menander
 The Garland by Meleager
 Aeschylus

Allusions/references to actual history, geography and current science
 Begins in Rome in AD 72, during the reign of Emperor Vespasian. 
 The journey takes them through Nabatea to Petra, then to the Decapolis and Palmyra.

Release details
 1994, UK, Century Hardback (out of print)
 1995, UK, Arrow, Paperback 
 1995, UK, Magna, Large Print, 
 1996, US, Mysterious Press, Hardback (out of print)
 1997, US, Mysterious Press, Paperback 
 2003, UK, Arrow, Paperback  (as part of single-volume omnibus edition, Falco on the Loose, with Time to Depart and A Dying Light in Corduba)

References

External links 
lindseydavis.co.uk Author's Official Website

1994 British novels
Marcus Didius Falco novels
Historical novels
72
Petra in fiction
Century (imprint) books